"How Much More Can She Stand" is a song written by Harry Compton, and recorded by American country music artist Conway Twitty.  It was released in March 1971 as the first single and title track from the album How Much More Can She Stand.  The song was Twitty's sixth number one solo country hit.  The single stayed at number one for a single week and spent a total of 15 weeks on the country chart.

Personnel
Conway Twitty — lead vocals
Joe E. Lewis, The Jordanaires — background vocals
Harold Bradley — electric 6-string bass guitar
Grady Martin — electric guitar
Larry Butler — piano
Jimmy Capps — acoustic guitar
John Hughey — steel guitar
Tommy Markham — drums and percussion
Bob Moore — bass
Herman Wade — electric guitar

Chart performance

References

1971 singles
1971 songs
Conway Twitty songs
Song recordings produced by Owen Bradley
Decca Records singles